The 2012 Basildon Council election took place on 3 May 2012 to elect members of Basildon Borough Council in Essex, England. One third of the council seats was to be elected.

Overall results

|-
| colspan=2 style="text-align: right; margin-right: 1em" | Total
| style="text-align: right;" | 15
| colspan=5 |
| style="text-align: right;" | 35,967
| style="text-align: right;" |

All comparisons in vote share are to the corresponding 2008 election.

Ward results

Billericay East

Billericay West

Burstead

Crouch

Fryerns

Laindon Park

Langdon Hills

Lee Chapel North

Nethermayne

Pitsea North West

Pitsea South East

St. Martin's

Vange

Wickford North

Sources
https://web.archive.org/web/20120411150856/http://www.basildon.gov.uk/CHttpHandler.ashx?id=3946&p=0 Statement of Persons Nominated

References

2012
2012 English local elections
2010s in Essex